Moi Avenue may refer to:
Moi Avenue (Nairobi)
Moi Avenue (Mombasa)